Jahanara Begum is a Bangladeshi social worker.  Dubbed the Queen of Cottage Industry, she engages poor women in training and working in the cotton industry.

She was awarded Independence Day Award in 1993 by the Government of Bangladesh.

Background and career
Begum was born to Azmat Ali. She was married to Moninul Islam Miyagi. After the wedding, she moved to Adda village of Barura Upazila.

Begum wrote books on cottage industry and its development and history:
 Comilla Shilpo Bishok Pustak (1976)
 Bashtobayone Adda Grame Kutir Shipler Oboshon (1976)
 Jahan Ara's Kutir Shilpo Rushiar (1980)
 Embroidery Design Pustak (1984)
 Dorji Biddya Shikka (1986)
 Kutir Shilper Jari Ghan (1988)
 Kutir Shilpo (1988) 
 Utpadito Pather Shochitro Catalog (1990)

Awards
 Kutir Shilper Kandari by the then governor Azam Khan (1962)
 The Comilla Foundation Gold Medal (1977 and 1985)
 National Social Welfare Award (1988)
 Independence Day Award (1993)
 The Rotary Club Award (2000) 
 Shada Moner Manush

References

Living people
People from Comilla
Bangladeshi social workers
Recipients of the Independence Day Award
Place of birth missing (living people)
Date of birth missing (living people)
Year of birth missing (living people)